Garfield Township is a township in Jackson County, Kansas, USA.  As of the 2000 census, its population was 624.

Geography
Garfield Township covers an area of 34 square miles (88.06 square kilometers); of this, 0.17 square miles (0.43 square kilometers) or 0.49 percent is water. The stream of Bills Creek runs through this township.

Cities and towns
 Denison (vast majority)

Unincorporated towns
 Carbon (historical)
(This list is based on USGS data and may include former settlements.)

Adjacent townships
 Straight Creek Township (north)
 Kapioma Township, Atchison County (east)
 Delaware Township, Jefferson County (southeast)
 Cedar Township (south)
 Franklin Township (west)
 Liberty Township (northwest)

Major highways
 K-16
 K-116

References
 U.S. Board on Geographic Names (GNIS)
 United States Census Bureau cartographic boundary files

External links
 US-Counties.com
 City-Data.com

Townships in Jackson County, Kansas
Townships in Kansas